Martin Driller (born 2 January 1970) is a German former professional footballer who played as a forward.

Honours
Borussia Dortmund
 DFL-Supercup: 1989

References

1970 births
Living people
Sportspeople from Paderborn
German footballers
Footballers from North Rhine-Westphalia
Association football forwards
Borussia Dortmund players
Borussia Dortmund II players
FC St. Pauli players
1. FC Nürnberg players
FC Ingolstadt 04 players
Bundesliga players
2. Bundesliga players